Ytri Dalur is the southernmost of the valleys of Fuglafjørður on the island of Eysturoy in the Faroes. Ytri Dalur is also referred to as Kambsdalur. 

The valleys of Fuglafjørður can be divided into three categories: The eastern valleys, the western valleys and the northern valleys.

The valleys of Fuglafjørður

The eastern valleys 
 Ytri Dalur (also called Kambsdalur)
 Heimari Dalur (sometimes called Breiðádalur)
 Innari Dalur (sometimes called Jøkladalur)

The western valleys 
 Halgadalur
 Góðidalur

The northern valleys 
 Flatirnar 
 Hjarðardalur

References 

Heimsatlas. Føroya Skúalbókagrunnur, Tórshavn, 1993. Page 6–7. 

Eysturoy
Valleys of the Faroe Islands